The Treaty of Mendota was signed in Mendota, Minnesota on August 5, 1851 between the United States federal government and the Mdewakanton and Wahpekute Dakota people of Minnesota.

The agreement was signed near Pilot Knob on the south bank of the Minnesota River and within sight of Fort Snelling. The treaty stipulated that the Mdewakanton and Wahpekute bands were to receive US$1,410,000 in return for relocating to the Lower Sioux Agency on the Minnesota River near present-day Morton, Minnesota along with giving up their rights to a significant portion of southern Minnesota.

With the signing of the Treaty of Mendota along with the earlier Treaty of Traverse des Sioux, most of southern Minnesota became open to white settlement.

Map of ceded territory can be seen through the Library of Congress here in orange

Treaty 
(names are presented here in original forms as written and spelled by Americans in the treaty itself)

ARTICLE 1.

The peace and friendship existing between the United States and the Med-ay-wa-kan-toan and Wah-pay-koo-tay bands of Dakota or Native Americans shall be perpetual.

ARTICLE 2.

The said Med-ay-wa-kan-toan and Wah-pay-koo-tay bands of Indians do hereby cede and relinquish all their lands and all their right, title and claim to any lands whatever, in the Territory of Minnesota, or in the State of Iowa.

ARTICLE 3.

[Stricken out.] (see end of section and note contribution to the Dakota War of 1862)

ARTICLE 4.

In further and full consideration of said cession and relinquishment, the United States agree to pay to said Indians the sum of one million four hundred and ten thousand dollars, ($1,410,000) at the several times, in the manner and for the purposes following, to wit: 
 1st. To the chiefs of the said bands, to enable them to settle their affairs and comply with their present just engagements; and in consideration of their removing themselves to the country set apart for them as above, (which they agree to do within one year after the ratification of this treaty, without further cost or expense to the United States,) and in consideration of their subsisting themselves the first year after their removal, (which they agree to do without further cost or expense on the part of the United States,) the sum of two hundred and twenty thousand dollars ($220,000.) Provided, That said sum shall be paid, one-half to the chiefs of the Med-ay-wa-kan-toan band, and one-half to the chief and headmen of the Wah-pay-koo-tay band, in such manner as they, hereafter, in open council, shall respectively request, and as soon after the removal of said Indians to the home set apart for them as the necessary appropriations therefor shall be made by Congress.
 2nd. To be laid out, under the direction of the President, for the establishment of manual-labor schools; the erection of mills and blacksmith shops, opening farms, fencing and breaking land, and for such other beneficial objects as may be deemed most conducive to the prosperity and happiness of said Indians, thirty thousand dollars ($30,000.)
The balance of said sum of one million four hundred and ten thousand dollars, ($1,410,000) to wit: one million, one hundred and sixty thousand dollars ($1,160,000) to remain in trust with the United States, and five per cent. interest thereon to be paid annually to said Indians for the period of fifty years, commencing on the first day of July, eighteen hundred and fifty-two (1852,) which shall be in f ull payment of said balance, principal and interest: said payments to be made and applied, under the direction of the President as follows, to wit:

 3rd. For a general agricultural improvement and civilization fund, the sum of twelve thousand dollars, ($12,000.)
 4th. For educational purposes, the sum of six thousand dollars, ($6,000.)
 5th. For the purchase of goods and provisions, the sum of ten thousand dollars, ($10,000.)
 6th. For money annuity, the sum of thirty thousand dollars, ($30,000.)

ARTICLE 5.

The entire annuity, provided for in the first section of the second article of the treaty of September twenty-ninth, eighteen hundred and thirty-seven, (1837,) including an unexpended balance that may be in the Treasury on the first of July, eighteen hundred and fifty-two, (1852,) shall thereafter be paid in money.

ARTICLE 6.

The laws of the United States prohibiting the introduction and sale of spirituous liquors in the Indian country shall be in full force and effect throughout the territory hereby ceded and lying in Minnesota until otherwise directed by Congress or the President of the United States.

ARTICLE 7.

Rules and regulations to protect the rights of persons and property among the Indian parties to this Treaty, and adapted to their condition and wants, may be prescribed and enforced in such manner as the President or the Congress of the United States, from time to time, shall direct.

In witness whereof, the said Luke Lea and Alexander Ramsey, Commissioners on the part of the United States and the undersigned Chiefs and Headmen of the Med-ay-wa-kan-toan and Wah-pay-koo-tay bands of Dakota or Sioux Indians, have hereunto set their hands, at Mendota, in the Territory of Minnesota, this fifth day of August, Anno Domini, one thousand eight hundred and fifty-one.

L. Lea.

Alex. Ramsey.

Med-ay-wa-kan-toans.

Chief Ta-oya-te-duta, (his scarlet people, or "Little Crow")

Headmen Wa-kan-o-zhan, (Sacred Light, or Medicine Bottle)

Tee-tchay, (Top of the Lodge or "Jim." or "Old Thad")

Ta-tchan-h' pee-sa-pa, (His "Black Tomahawk.")

Ma-ka-na-ho-toan-ma-nee, (At whose tread the earth resounds)

H'-da-ee-yan-kay, (he runs rattling)

Too-kan-a-hena-ma-nee, (Walker on the Medicine Boulders or Stones)

Wa-m'dee-doo-ta, (Scarlet War Eagle)

Na-ghee-yoo-shkan, (He moves the Ghosts or Shadows)

Shoank'-a-ska, ("White Dog")

Hoo-sa-nee-ghee, (one leg yellow or orange colored)

Wa-keen-yan-wash-tay, ("Good Thunder")

Chief Wa-pa-sha, (The Standard, or "Red Leaf")

Headmen Wa-kan-hendee-o-ta, (Many Lightnings)

Tchan-h'pee-yoo-ka, (He has a war club)

Heen-han-doo-ta, (Red Owl)

Ma ka-ka-ee-day, (He sets the Earth on fire)

Ee-a-hee-herday, (He bursts out speaking)

Chief Wa-koo-tay, (The "Shooter")

Headmen Ma-h'pee-ya-ma za, (Metal cloud)

Ta-ma-za-ho-wash-tay, (his good iron voice)

Ma-ka ta-na-zheen, (He stands on the earth)

Ee-wan-kam-ee-na-zhan, (He stands above)

Wa-kan-ta-pay-ta, (The Spirit's Fire)

Na-ghee-mee-tcha-keetay, (He kills the Ghosts)

Een-yan-sha-sha, (Red Stones)

Ee-day-wa-kan, (Sacred Blaze)

Ta-sag-yay-ma-za, (His metal Staff)

Chief Ma-h'pee mee-tchash-tay, (man of the sky)

Headmen Wee-tchan-h'pee, (The Star)

Ta-tay-na-zhee-na, (Little standing Wind)

Headmen Hoak-shee-dan-doo-ta, (Scarlet Boy)

Am-pay-sho-ta, (Smoky Day)

Ha-ha-ka-ma-za, (Metal Elk)

Ta - tay - h'moo - he - ya - ya, ("Whistling Wind")

Wa-pa-ma-nee, (He strikes walking)

Ma-h'pee-ya-wa-kan, (Sacred Cloud)

Ta-tchan-h'pee-ma-za, (His Iron War Club)

Chief Ma-za-ho-ta, (Gray Metal)

Headmen Wa-soo-mee-tchash-ta-shnee, (Wicked or "Bad Hail")

Oan-ketay-hee-dan, (Little Water-God or "Little Whale")

Tcha-noon-pay-sa, (The Smoker)

Ta-tay-to-kay-tcha, (Other wind)

Ka-ho, (The Rambler about)

Chief Ta-tchan-koo-wash-tay, (Good Road)

Headmen Ta-tay-o-wo-teen-ma-nee, (Roaring Wind that walks)

O-yay-tchan-ma-nee, (Track Maker)

Ta-shoark-ay, (His Dog)

Chief Sha-k'pay, ("Six")

Headmen A-no-ghee-ma-zheen, (He that stands on both sides)

Hoo-ya-pa, (Eagle Head)

Ta-tay-mee-na, (Round Wind)

Ka-t'pan-t' pan-oo, (He comes pounding to pieces)

Ma-h'pee-ya-henda-keen-yan, (Walking across a cloud)

Wa-pee-ghee, (The orange red speckled cloud)

Ma-za-wa-menoo-ha, (Gourd shell metal medicine rattle)

Chief Hay-ee-tcha-h'moo-ma-nee, (Horn whistling walking)

Headmen Pay-pay, (Sharp)

Ta-wo-ta-way-doo-ta, (His Scarlet Armor)

Hay-pee, (Third Son)

A-pay-ho-ta, (Grey mane or crest)

Ho-tan-een, (His voice can be heard)

Ma-h'pee-ya-shee-tcha, (Bad Cloud)

Ta-wa-tcheen, (His mind)

Han-yay-too-ko-kee-pa-pee, (Night which is feared)

In presence of Thomas Foster, Secretary. Nathaniel McLean, Indian Agent. Alexander Fariboult, P. Prescott, G. H. Pond, Interpreters. David Olmstead; W. C. Henderson; Alexis Bailly; Richard Chute; A. Jackson; A. L. Larpenteur; W. H. Randall, Sr.; A. S. H. White; H. L. Dousman; Frederic B. Sibley; Marten McLeod; Geo. H. Faribault.

To the Indian names are subjoined marks.

SUPPLEMENTAL ARTICLE.
1st. The United States do hereby stipulate to pay the Sioux bands of Indians, parties to this treaty, at the rate of ten cents per acre, for the lands included in the reservation provided for in the third article of the treaty as originally agreed upon in the following words:

ARTICLE 3.

"In part consideration of the foregoing cession and relinquishment, the United States do hereby set apart for the future occupancy and home of the Dakota Indians, parties to this treaty, to be held by them as Indian lands are held, a tract of country of the average width of ten miles on either side of the Minnesota River, and bounded on the west by the Tchaytam-bay and Yellow Medicine Rivers, and on the east by the Little Rock River and a line running due south from its mouth to the Waraju River; the boundaries of said tract to be marked out by as straight lines as practicable, whenever and in such manner as the President of the United States shall direct: Provided, That said tract shall be held and occupied by said bands in common, and that they shall hereafter participate equally and alike, in all the benefits derived from any former treaty between said bands, or either of them, and the United States," which article has been stricken out of the treaty by the Senate. The said payment to be in lieu of said reservation; the amount, when ascertained under instructions from the Department of the Interior, to be added to the trust fund provided for in the fourth article. 
2d. It is further stipulated that the President be authorized, with the assent of the said bands of Indians, parties to this treaty, and as soon after they shall have given their assent to the foregoing article, as may be convenient, to cause to be set apart by appropriate landmarks and boundaries, such tracts of country without the limits of the cession made by the first article of the treaty as may be satisfactory for their future occupancy and home: Provided, That the President may, by the consent of these Indians, vary the conditions aforesaid if deemed expedient.

Values Adjusted For Inflation 
There are numerous ways to try to estimate what the value of this treaty would be in current US dollars. Since the CPI was not initiated until the 20th Century, other measures must be used to look back on inflation and valuation levels in the United States.

Here are some different valuations in today's money of the $1,410,000 in 1851

$40,800,000	 using the Consumer Price Index

$30,700,000	 using the GDP deflator

$296,000,000	 using the unskilled wage

$576,000,000	 using the Production Worker Compensation

$578,000,000	 using the nominal GDP per capita

$7,380,000,000   using the relative share of GDP

As with most economic estimates like this, that look beyond the modern, intricate tracking of national inflation, there is a dramatic range in the predicted present value of the treaty's amount. The value calculated using the "relative share of GDP" should be given extra weight since it is weighted to the state of the overall economic size and strength. Even though this measurement is imperfect, it is much less so than the other indicators which either were not correctly used for the duration of this time, or have been extrapolated back to 1851 using other data. Because of this, the CPI measurement is dramatically understating the present value of the money.

Using this same calculation range, the 10 cents per acre that was paid to the Native Americans comes out to a present value range of between $2.90 and $523 per acre. Even using the upper end of this range which is probably the most realistic, that is very low property value being assigned to the wilderness in present-day standards. of course there are other effects to weigh in, such as present day advanced agricultural and foresting technologies which would affect this number by a multiple value, the evidence here shows that the United States dramatically undercut the Native Americans with their purchasing of their land, and falls in line with much of the other land purchases from Native Americans throughout the 19th century.

Provisions for assimilating Native Americans
Similarly to countless other land purchasing treaties between Native American nations and the U.S., The Treaty of Mendota holds evidence of the ongoing Americanization of Native Americans. In Article 4 of this treaty, the U.S. forced the allocation of certain sums of the overall payment to the Native Americans for such purposes as setting up types of educational and economic with the specific argument that it causes prosperity and happiness. Anthropological and historical perspectives have since shown, of course, that much of the focus of these types of provisions was twofold: to "de-barbarize" the Native Americans, and also to try to encourage the Native American's to contribute back to the American economy in the future, if not immediately.

In article 7, de facto sovereignty of the Sioux People affected by this treaty is very much shifted towards the President of the United States and his judgement. No explicit language is used to grant the Native Americans sovereignty over their reservation land.

Furthermore, article 6 prohibits the sale of alcohol in the region. This is seen as a precursor to the 1897 amendment to the Indian Appropriations Act which banned the sale of alcohol to Native Americans. This part of the law was ultimately struck down in the 1916 court decision United States v. Nice.

Contribution to the Dakota War of 1862

Ultimately, this act treaty can be seen as a continuation of the factors leading to the Dakota War of 1862 between the U.S. and the Sioux. Following the stricken article 3 in both this treaty and Treaty of Traverse des Sioux, along with many failures to pay the Native American's in due time for numerous reasons ranging from corruption in the Bureau of Indian Affairs and costs of the U.S. Civil War, the Sioux people were gravely shorted in their dealings with U.S. They were forced to shift from a nomadic culture into a fixed one, along reservation land that was seemingly guaranteed to be their own, but eventually proved not to be true. As their land was increasingly encroached upon by the American government and businesses, especially after Minnesota was admitted as a state of the Union in 1858, economic shifts occurred leading to depletion of wild game and the inability for the Native Americans to successfully engage in fur trade.

This fueled anger and discontent and eventually helped trigger the Dakota War of 1862.

See also 
Treaty of St. Peters
Treaty of Traverse des Sioux

General references 
Meyer, Roy Willard. History of the Santee Sioux: United States Indian Policy on Trial. Lincoln: University of Nebraska Press, 1993.
http://digital.library.okstate.edu/kappler/vol2/treaties/sio0591.htm 
Samuel H. Williamson, "Seven Ways to Compute the Relative Value of a U.S. Dollar Amount, 1774 to present," MeasuringWorth, April 2010.
Treaty of Mendota in MNopedia, the Minnesota Encyclopedia

Mendota
Native American history of Minnesota
Sioux Wars
History of Minnesota
Dakota
1851 treaties
1851 in the United States
August 1851 events